Chicoma Mountain (also spelled Tschicoma or Tchicoma) is the highest point in the Jemez Mountains, a prominent mountain range in the U.S. State of New Mexico.  The tree line in this area is exceptionally high, and the mountain is forested almost all the way to its summit which is conspicuous from the towns of Los Alamos, Santa Fe, and Española and other areas in the valley of the Rio Grande in northern New Mexico.  Like the rest of the Jemez, it is of volcanic origin; it lies on the northeast rim of the Valles Caldera, one of the best examples of a caldera in the United States.

The mountain is sacred to many of the Puebloan peoples of New Mexico, who traditionally regarded it as the "center of all."  Much of it lies within the territory of the Santa Clara Pueblo.  Access by hikers, hunters, and others, is correspondingly limited, although the summit can be reached via public lands on the north side.  The Puye Cliff Dwellings in Santa Clara Canyon are an archaeological site of some significance; however, the cliff dwellings are not near Chicoma. Puye Cliff Dwellings are accessible via NM 30 to NM 5, about 30 minutes south of Chicoma Mountain. The site is located on the pueblo's land on the east side of the mountain, and are sometimes open to the public for a fee.

See also 
 Santa Fe National Forest

References

External links 
 
 

Jemez Mountains
Mountains of New Mexico
Religious places of the indigenous peoples of North America
Landforms of Rio Arriba County, New Mexico
Mountains of Rio Arriba County, New Mexico